Erg Chebbi (Berber: ⴻⵔⴳ ⵛⴱⵉ) is one of Morocco's several ergs – large seas of dunes formed by wind-blown sand. There are several other ergs such as Erg Chigaga near [[M'Hamid El Ghizlane|M'hamid]. They are part of the Sahara Desert.

Description
In places, the dunes of Erg Chebbi rise up to 150 meters from the surrounding hamada (rocky desert) and altogether it spans an area of 28 kilometers from north to south and up to 5–7 kilometers from east to west lining the Algerian border.

The nearest sizable town is Erfoud, about 60 kilometers further north. One other city is Rissani, around 40 kilometers from Merzouga.  Rissani was the site of a kingdom known as Sijilmassa, which became prosperous from the 8th to the 14th century due to its control of the caravan routes.

Although rainfall is not very common, in 2006 flooding adjacent to the dunes destroyed many buildings and killed three people.

Tourism
Merzouga, the local tourist center, is located on the western lee of the dunes, together with some 70 or more hotels and auberges running north-south along the dunes. Many companies offer camel trips into the dunes, taking tourists on overnight trips to permanent campsites several kilometres into the erg, and out of sight of the hotels. Erg Chebbi's proximity to the tourist center has led to the erg sometimes being referred to as "dunes of Merzouga."

During the warmest part of the year, Moroccans come to Erg Chebbi to be buried neck-deep in the hot sand for a few minutes at a time. This is considered to be a treatment for rheumatism.

Features

See also
Aeolian processes
Blowout (geology)
List of ergs

References

Ergs of Africa
Landforms of Morocco
Deserts of Algeria
Errachidia Province
Geography of Drâa-Tafilalet